Tikamporn Changkeaw (born December 12, 1984 in Suphanburi) is a Thai indoor volleyball player. She is a member of the Thailand women's national volleyball team.

Clubs 
  Idea Khonkaen (2008–2013)
  Sisaket (2013–2014)
  Bangkok Glass (2014–2018)
  Nakhon Ratchasima (2018–2019)
 Khonkaen Star (2019–2020)
 Diamond Food  (2020–)

Awards

Individuals
 2012–13 Thailand League – "Best Libero"
 2012–13 Thailand League – "Best Receiver"
 2013–14 Thailand League – "Best Libero"
 2014 VTV International Cup – "Best Libero"
 2015 Asian Club Championship – "Best Libero"
 2016 Asian Club Championship – "Best Libero"
 2020 Thailand League – "Best Libero"

Clubs
 2012–13 Thailand League –  Champion, with Idea Khonkaen
 2013 Thai–Denmark Super League –  Champion, with Idea Khonkaen
 2013–14 Thailand League –  Runner-up, with Sisaket
 2014–15 Thailand League –  Champion, with Bangkok Glass
 2015 Thai-Denmark Super League –  Champion, with Bangkok Glass
 2015–16 Thailand League –  Champion, with Bangkok Glass
 2016 Thai–Denmark Super League -  Champion, with Bangkok Glass
 2016–17 Thailand League –  Runner-up, with Bangkok Glass
 2018–19 Thailand League –  Champion, with Nakhon Ratchasima
 2015 Asian Club Championship –  Champion, with Bangkok Glass
 2016 Asian Club Championship –  Bronze medal, with Bangkok Glass
 2020 Thailand League –  Runner-up, with Khonkaen Star

References

External links
 FIVB Biography

1984 births
Living people
Tikamporn Changkeaw
Tikamporn Changkeaw
Tikamporn Changkeaw